"The Tinderbox" is a literary fairy tale by Hans Christian Andersen about a soldier who acquires a magic tinderbox capable of summoning three powerful dogs to do his bidding. When the soldier has one of the dogs transport a sleeping princess to his room, he is sentenced to death but cunningly summons the dogs to save his life.

In the Aarne-Thompson tale index, The Tinderbox is type 562: The Spirit in the Blue Light. Other tales of this type include The Three Dogs and The Blue Light.

Commentaries
Andersen biographer Jackie Wullschlager writes, "["The Tinderbox"] is a confident, young man's tale—jaunty, brisk, and exhilarating. It celebrates youth over age and it has the energy and hope and satisfaction of a traditional folk tale—"Aladdin", "Puss in Boots", "Jack and the Beanstalk"—whose young hero overcomes adversity and ends a contented, successful adult."

Adaptations
"The Tinderbox" was the subject of the first Danish animated feature film in 1946 directed by Svend Methling and animated by Børge Ring.
The Tinder Box is a 1959 film based on the story.
In 2007, "The Tinderbox" was adapted into a 30-minute ballet with sets and costumes designed by Queen Margrethe II. The ballet opened in the Pantomime Theatre of Copenhagen's Tivoli Gardens in July 2007. It was the third time the monarch designed a ballet for Tivoli based on Andersen's works.
Lucy Corin's "Eyes of Dogs", a version of "The Tinderbox," appeared in 2013 as a short story in her One Hundred Apocalypses and Other Apocalypses.
Ginger's Tale is a 2020 Russian traditional animation film loosely based on the fairy tale that features a magical artifact similar to the Tinderbox that grants the ability to summon gold and only a noble friend, Ginger can help save the wielder of the artifact from its effects
In the 1950s Sir Michael Redgrave made a recording (12 inch vinyl, 33 1/3) entitled "Tales of Hans Christian Andersen" in which he reads "The Tinderbox" and other stories. This recording was briefly reviewed in "Billboard" dated 30 June, 1958. In "Selected Lists of Children's Books and Recordings" by the American Library Association, Children's Services Division, the recording is referred to as "Caedmon TC 1073" and as "Distinguished reading, faithful to the R.P. Keigwin text". It is also available as part of an audiobook entitled "The Very Best of Hans Christian Anderson" (note this non-standard spelling of his name) and on music sites such as Spotify.

Video game
In 1985, Gremlin Graphics released a ZX Spectrum-only children's adventure game titled Tinderbox, of which all profit went to the Ethiopian famine relief fund through Soft Aid. In the game, written by Colin C. Chadburn, a wounded foot soldier named Tom must defeat a wicked witch and an evil king who together cruelly rule the country in order to save and marry the beautiful Princess Rowella. Tom does not kill the villains, instead he just scares the witch-queen away and banishes the king.

Tinderbox received mixed reviews, ranging from only one out of five stars from Sinclair User, to the scores of 7/10 from both Crash and Your Spectrum. According to Home Computing Weekly, "the game could have been a massive hit" if only it was written in The Quill instead of BASIC.

Notes

Footnotes

References

External links

"Fyrtøiet". Original Danish text.
"The Tinder Box". English translation by Jean Hersholt.

1835 short stories
Animal tales
Danish fairy tales
Witchcraft in fairy tales
Short stories by Hans Christian Andersen
ATU 560-649
Fictional objects